Capo San Marco Lighthouse is an active lighthouse located on Capo San Marco promontory, on the tip of Sinis peninsula overlooking the ruins below of Tharros.  The structure is in the municipality of Cabras, in the west of the island on the Sea of Sardinia.

Description
The lighthouse is completely automated and managed by the Marina Militare with the identification code number 1390 E.F.

The lighthouse, since 1969, was managed by Elisabetta Deriu widow of the lighthouse keeper who died in service in 1967; she succeed to get her husband's job and she became the first female keeper in Italy after attending the professional training course in La Spezia.

See also
 List of lighthouses in Italy

References

External links

 Servizio Fari Marina Militare

Lighthouses in Italy
Buildings and structures in Sardinia